Austerfield is a village and civil parish in the Metropolitan Borough of Doncaster, South Yorkshire, England. The population in 2001 was 571, which fell to 536 at the 2011 Census.

Heritage
The name Austerfield derives from the Germanic Ouestraefeld, meaning Eastern field.

The Council of Austerfield was convened here by King Aldfrith of Northumbria in AD 702 and attended by Berhtwald, Archbishop of Canterbury to decide on whether Saint Wilfrid should become Archbishop of York. Austerfield was then on the border between the two Anglo-Saxon kingdoms of Northumbria and Mercia.

Austerfield contains the 11th-century church of St Helena. The builder of it in 1080 was John de Builli, using stone from quarries at Roche Abbey. The church today has 19th-century several stained-glass windows designed by Charles Eamer Kempe. The nave has a sheela na gig, a rare type of quasi-erotic stone carving of a female figure sometimes found in Norman churches. This had been blocked into a wall in the 14th century and was rediscovered in 1898 during restoration work.

Notable people
In birth order:
William Bradford (1590–1657), a Pilgrim Father and Governor of Plymouth Colony, was born in Austerfield and baptised in a font rediscovered at a local farm 40 years ago, which can now be seen in the church.
Roy Clarke (born 1930), an English comedy writer known for the sitcoms Last of the Summer Wine and Open All Hours, was born in Austerfield.

Transport
The nearest railway station to Austerfield is at Doncaster (9½ miles, 15 km). It is served by a bus route, as are Bawtry, Worksop and Sheffield. The A1M trunk road between London and the North passes 5 miles (8 km) to the west of the village.

References

External links

Villages in Doncaster
Civil parishes in South Yorkshire